Morshed Alam (born 29 March 1950) is a Bangladeshi business magnate, politician and the incumbent Member of Parliament from Noakhali-2. He was declared a Commercially Important Person (CIP) for the fiscal year of 1996–1997, 1999–2000, 2008–2009 & 2010–2011 (export) by the Ministry of Commerce, Government of the People's Republic of Bangladesh. He is also the recipient of the Prime Minister's National Export Trophy, for which he won gold and silver four times and bronze once. In 1969 he founded Bengal Group and it is one of the largest plastic and manufacturing groups in Bangladesh today.

Early life
Alam was born on 29 March 1950 in Noakhali, Bangladesh. He was born to father late Haji Md. Idris Mia and mother late Tahera Begum.

Career
Industrialist Alam is actively involved in politics. He is the chairman of Bengal group. He was elected a member of parliament for the first time. He is the member of trustee board of The People's University of Bangladesh and chairman, National Life Insurance Company Limited and Director of Mercantile Bank Limited.

Social work 
Alam established Morshed Alam High School at Nateshwor, Sonaimuri, Noakhali. He also life donor member of Kazi Nagar Madrasa and Bazra High School at Noakhali and Motijheel Ideal High School, Dhaka.

Awards 
 CIP, 1996–1997, 1999–2000, 2008–2009 & 2010-2011 (Export)
 Prime Minister's National Export Trophy (Gold), 2013–2014, 2012–2013, 2006–2007, 2000-2001
 Prime Minister's National Export Trophy (Silver), 2013–2014, 2012–2013, 2010–2011, 2009-2010
 Prime Minister's National Export Trophy (Bronze), 2010-2011
 Best Enterprise Award 2007, by DHL and The Daily Star

References

External links
 

Awami League politicians
Living people
11th Jatiya Sangsad members
10th Jatiya Sangsad members
1950 births
People from Noakhali District